"Sophisticated Lady" is a jazz standard, composed as an instrumental in 1932 by Duke Ellington.

Background
Additional credit is given to publisher Irving Mills whose words were added to the song by Mitchell Parish. The words met with approval from Ellington, who described them as "wonderful—but not entirely fitted to my original conception". That original conception was inspired by three of Ellington's grade school teachers. "They taught all winter and toured Europe in the summer. To me that spelled sophistication."

Lawrence Brown, the trombone player in Ellington's band at the time, claimed that he was responsible for the main hook in the A section of the tune. Ellington paid him $15 for his contribution, but he was never officially credited.

Duke Ellington and His Orchestra introduced "Sophisticated Lady" in 1933 with an instrumental recording of the song that featured solos by Toby Hardwick on alto sax, Barney Bigard on clarinet, Lawrence Brown on trombone and Ellington on piano. The recording entered the charts on 27 May 1933 and rose to number three.

Singer Adelaide Hall recorded with Ellington in 1927, 1932, and 1933, but only recorded two versions of "Sophisticated Lady", in 1944 (with Phil Green And His Rhythm) and in 1976, on her album "Hall of Ellington." The song appeared on the soundtrack of the 1989/90 documentary celebrating her life entitled Sophisticated Lady.
In his autobiography 'Music Is My Mistress' on p106 Ellington writes that 'George Gershwin once told Oscar Levant that he wished he had written the bridge to Sophisticated Lady, and that made me very proud'

Other recordings
 Sylvia Brooks – Dangerous Liaisons (2009)
 Casa Loma Orchestra – 1933
 Chick Corea – Chick Corea Akoustic Band (1989)
 Larry Coryell – Toku Do
 Billy Eckstine – 1947
 Duke Ellington – Masterpieces by Ellington (1950)
 Adelaide Hall – Adelaide Hall Live at the Riverside Studios
 Billie Holiday – All or Nothing at All (1956)
 Stan Kenton – Kenton with Voices (1957)
 Marcus Miller – Silver Rain
 Mulgrew Miller and Niels-Henning Ørsted Pedersen – The Duets (1999)
 Charles Mingus – The Great Concert of Charles Mingus (1964)
 Thelonious Monk – Thelonious Monk Plays Duke Ellington (1955)
 Spud Murphy – Gone with the Woodwinds (1955)
 Don Redman – 1933
 Boz Scaggs – But Beautiful (2003)
 Art Tatum – 1933 and 1954
 Toots Thielemans with Fred Hersch – Only Trust Your Heart (1988)
 The Vanguard Jazz Orchestra – Can I Persuade You? (2001)
 Sarah Vaughan - After Hours (1961)
 Abbey Lincoln - Golden Lady (1981)
 Dave Grusin - Homage to Duke (1993)
 Jaco Pastorius - Invitation (1983)
 Caetano Veloso - A Foreign Sound (2004)
 Tony Bennett - Cheek to Cheek (2014)
 Ray Stevens - Melancholy Fescue (2021)

See also
List of 1930s jazz standards

References

External links
 "Sophisticated Lady" at jazzstandards.com
 Who Was Duke's Sophisticated Lady?

1930s jazz standards
1932 songs
Billie Holiday songs
Rosemary Clooney songs
Nancy Wilson (jazz singer) songs
Songs with music by Duke Ellington
Songs with lyrics by Irving Mills
Songs with lyrics by Mitchell Parish
Jazz songs
Jazz compositions in A-flat major